The 17643 / 17644 Circar Express is a daily express train run by Indian Railways from Puducherry railway station to Kakinada Port railway station. The train covers a distance of 829 km.

Arrival and departure
Train no. 17643 departs from Puducherry every day at 13:00 hrs. reaching Kakinada Port the next day at 10:10hrs. Train no. 17644 departs from Kakinada Port every day at 14:20 hrs. reaching Puducherry the next day at 11:00 hrs.

Locomotive

Routes and halts

Rake sharing
This train has rake sharing with [(chengalpattu to kacheguda express)] (17652/17651)

Average speed and frequency
The train runs at an average speed of 43 km/h. It runs on a daily basis.

Demands 
As per demands this train is extended from Chengalpattu Junction to Puducherry.

References

External links
 17643 Circar Express
 17644 Circar Express

Transport in Kakinada
Railway services introduced in 1965
Named passenger trains of India
Rail transport in Tamil Nadu
Rail transport in Andhra Pradesh
Express trains in India